Guess What We Learned in School Today? (also released in the United States as I Ain't No Buffalo) is a 1970 film directed by John G. Avildsen and written by Eugene Price.  The movie premiered at the Cannes Film Festival in 1970 and opened in the United States in 1971. Although it was shot before Avildsen's Joe, it got distribution afterward due to Joe's success.

Tagline: "Love American Style with a touch of X."

Plot
Parents in a small, conservative community want to ban sex education in schools, labeling it a Communist plot. However, the two people leading the charge against sex ed are revealed to be an impotent alcoholic and a gay policeman.

Principal cast

Critical reception
Roger Greenspun of The New York Times did not care for the film at all:

See also
 List of American films of 1970
List of American films of 1971

References

External links
 
 

1970 films
Films directed by John G. Avildsen
American sex comedy films
1970s sex comedy films
Golan-Globus films
1970 comedy films
1970s English-language films
1970s American films